Amir Hossein Toukhteh (born April 9, 2001 in Urmia) is an Iranian volleyball player who plays as a middle blocker for the Iranian national team.

Toukhteh in 2018 year invited to Iran senior national team by Igor Kolaković and made his debut match against Brazil in the 2018 Nations League.

Honours

National team
Asian Games
Gold medal (1): 2018
U21 World Championship
Gold medal (1): 2019
Asian U20 Championship
Gold medal (1): 2018
U19 World Championship
Gold medal (1): 2017

Individual
Best Middle Blocker: 2017 U19 World Championship

References

External links 

 

2001 births
Living people
Iranian men's volleyball players
People from Urmia
Asian Games medalists in volleyball
Volleyball players at the 2018 Asian Games
Medalists at the 2018 Asian Games
Asian Games gold medalists for Iran
21st-century Iranian people